Band-e Sareq is a village in Samangan Province, in northern Afghanistan. It is located in the western part of Samangan Province, approximately 30 kilometres northeast of Chamchal.

See also
 Samangan Province

References

External links
Maplandia World Gazetteer

Populated places in Samangan Province